Herpha, also known as Erpha and Herpa and Erpa, was a town of ancient Cappadocia, inhabited during Hellenistic, Roman, and Byzantine times.

Its site is located at the crossing of the Karmalas on the main road, Asiatic Turkey.

References

Populated places in ancient Cappadocia
Former populated places in Turkey
Populated places of the Byzantine Empire
Roman towns and cities in Turkey
History of Kayseri Province